Cauterets (in Occitan Cautarés, in Catalan Cautarés, in Aragonese Cautarès) is a spa town, a ski resort and a commune in the Hautes-Pyrénées department and the region of Occitanie in south-western France.

Geography

Meanwhile, Gaube Lake is approximately 1hr and 30 minutes walk from Cauterets or can be accessed by a chairlift from the Pont d'Espagne, a settlement on a mountainside crossed by a waterfall. The  is also accessible by cable car from where there are panoramic views over the Pyrenees. Cauterets is also a regular stopover for walkers travelling on the coast to coast Pyrenean GR10 walking route.

The minimum altitude, is located in the north, where the Gave de Cauterets leaves the communal area and enters that of Soulom.

Neighbouring Communes
The extensive commune of Cauterets is bordered by Spain to southwest and fourteen communes in France.

Springs

Cauterets is well known for its copious thermal springs. They are chiefly characterized by the presence of sulphur and silicate of soda, and are used in the treatment of diseases of the respiratory organs, rheumatism, skin diseases and many other maladies.  The main thermal baths, Thermes Cesar, were opened in 1843 and continue to offer treatments today.

Climate

Cauterets has a oceanic climate (Köppen climate classification Cfb).

Toponymy

Historical names:

Caldarez, (c. 1060, Cartulary of Saint-Savin; 1077–1078, ibid.; c. 1094, ibid.)
Vallem Caldarensem, Latin (1083–1094, ibid.; 1317, Meillon, Cartulary of Saint-Savin)
In valle Caldarea, Latin (1094–1118, ibid.)
de Cautereis, Latin (1168, Papal bull of Alexander III)
Cautares, (1285, Bigorre Clock)
De Cauteresio, Latin (1342, Pouillé of Tarbes).
De Cautaresio, Latin (1379, Tarbes proxy)
Cauteres, (1429, Bigorre ).
Cauterez, (1614, Guillaume Mauran)
Cauterés, (1790, Department 1)
Cauterez, (1790, Department 2)
The final -t is an error, as it was never used before the 19th century.

Etymology: The meaning doesn't pose a problem: From the Latin (villa/vallis) caldarensis = (villa or Valley) where there are hot baths, in Gascon "los cautarers".

Occitan name: Cautarés.

History

Prehistory and antiquity
Prehistoric and Protohistoric remnants have been found, many in the valleys above Cauterets: Eleven stone circles, four cromlech tumuli, six individual tumuli and five dolmens. The stone circles are particularly located in the Marcadau Valley and some plains and pastures.

There are few traces of the period preceding the Roman conquest. Of the Gallo-Roman period, remains were found which used Cauterets thermal waters, such as a swimming pool. On the balcony of Saint-Savin, a castrum was built as well as the Palatium Aemilianum villa. The Villa Bencer was located on the present site of the village of Cauterets.

Middle Ages
In the 8th or 9th century, a monk by the name of Sabinus came to live as a hermit in the valley. The future , his miracles and his canonization caused an influx of pilgrims. An abbey was built around his hermitage. It had the hôpital de Cauterès, named in a Papal Bull of the 12th century along with territories given by various lords, such as Charlemagne and the Comte de Bigorre. The abbey was plundered and destroyed by the Normans.

Between 1059 and 1078, Bernard III, Abbot of Saint-Savin, had installed a pool called "bain d'en-haut" [bath from above]. Cabin houses were grouped around this pool. This was the beginning of the village of Cauterets (Caouteres).

In the 12th century, a conflict arose between the inhabitants of Lavedan and those of the Aspe Valley for a theft of livestock; the result was the death of several Aspe people. The Bishop of Comminges, Bertrand excommunicated the Bigorre people who were repentant. They were sentenced to life imprisonment and to pay a yearly fine on the day of Saint Michel in the Church of Saint-Savin. It was regularly paid until 1789, and it was known as the tribut des Médailles [tribute of the medals].

Three baths existed around the different hot springs and there were twenty feus in the village. Gaston Phébus came to Cauterets to treat his deafness in 1380.

Early modern period
Return to "antique" values during the Renaissance of the 16th century favoured the return to the baths and the thermal waters. Multiple visits by Marguerite de Navarre in this century gave real fame to Cauterets.

In the 16th century, the Abbey of Saint-Savin lost its prestige and decayed due to lack of maintenance. During the French Wars of Religion, hydrotherapy stopped due to the destruction and wars against Spain.

The construction of passable roads in the 18th century to La Raillère helped the development of the valley. La Raillère became a water source of fashion thanks to editions of books on the water sources of Cauterets. At the end of the 18th century, the Bruzaud Spa was built.

Contemporary period

The 19th century and the golden age of spas

The thermal baths of César, the Grand Hôtel d'Angleterre and the Grand Hotel Continental were all created along with monumental facades. All are witnesses of a 19th-century golden age of spas. Among its famous visitors, George Sand went there in 1825, Chateaubriand in 1829 and Victor Hugo in 1843. However, the socialites weren't the only ones to attend Cauterets: Bernadette Soubirous, affected by asthma, went there on several occasions in 1858 and 1859.

The vogue of hydrotherapy in the 19th century brought many personalities including members of the Bonaparte family. Hortense de Beauharnais, Queen of Holland, daughter of Empress Joséphine and wife of Louis Bonaparte, King of Holland stayed in Cauterets from 18 June to 10 August 1807. Count Henry Russell and other famous mountaineers came to realise numerous ascents from the valley. On 8 September 1859, Napoleon III and Empress Eugenie visited Cauterets.

La Raillère was built in stone from 1818 to 1828.

Transport infrastructure developed strongly, including the line of railway between Lourdes and Pierrefitte which opened in 1871, then the Pierrefitte-Cauterets electric line in 1899, and the Cauterets-La Raillère tramway was put into service on 2 August 1897.

The 20th century: Towards a society of leisure
At the beginning of the 20th century, Louis Falisse was one of the pioneers of skiing in the Pyrenees. With Henri Sallenave and Louis Robach, he made the first ascents of the Vignemale and the Aneto on ski. The Cauterets ski club was founded in 1907. In 1910, the France Skiing Championship was organised at Eaux-Bonnes and Cauterets.

In 1937, the idea of a cable car to develop the skiing was launched but postponed due to World War II.

In the 1950s, during the construction of numerous hydroelectric dams, Cauterets refused the introduction of several selected at the Pont d'Espagne.

On 18 June 2013, a catastrophic flood destroyed several buildings of the village. The services of the General Council of the Hautes-Pyrénées commissioned a new section of road, in record time, of several hundred metres drawn on a mountainside, with a succession of spectacular laces that bypass the collapsed area.

Heraldry

Politics and administration

Intercommunality

List of mayors

Demography
In 2017, the commune had 908 inhabitants.

Tourism

Hydrotherapy

Cauterets is a spa town with instructions in ENT and Rheumatology. The waters of its eleven sources are exploited in two institutions that receive spa guests: The Baths of César in the village of Cauterets, and the Baths of the Gryphons in the hamlet of La Raillère. Sources still remain the property of a syndicate of the neighbouring communes.

Specialties
Confectionery arrived in the 16th century in Europe, the  came to the thermal water communes of the Pyrenees in the 19th century, including Cauterets, according to the recommendations of some medical practitioners, to reduce the sulphur water taste. Ten berlingot manufacturers existed in Cauterets at the beginning of the 20th century. There were four shops in 2014, three of which specialised in this product.

Winter sports resort

Cauterets is a winter sports resort where one can enjoy downhill skiing and cross country skiing. A new cable car was built in 2005 which can transport 2000 skiers per hour to the Cirque du Lys area.

Sports
The European Athletics Association organized the European Mountain Running Championships on 8 July 2007.

Cycling

Vuelta a España
 2003, stage 7, Huesca – Cauterets: Michael Rasmussen

Tour de France
1953, stage 10, Pau – Cauterets (2C): Jesús Loroño
1989, stage 9, Pau – Cauterets-Cambasque (1C): Miguel Induráin
1995, stage 15, Saint-Girons – Cauterets-Cambasque (1C): Richard Virenque
2015, stage 11, Pau – Cauterets (2C): Rafał Majka

Places and monuments

Architectural heritage
The Church of Our Lady, inaugurated in 1886, was erected at the site of the former demolished church in 1884. In 1995, the Association of the Friends of the Organ acquired a work by Pierre Baldi: "The Way of the Cross", 1st Prize of World Sacred Paintings in 1996, which stands today in the church.
Inaugurated in 1901, the old  was included in the title of historic monuments in 1981 for its façades and roofs. This is an original building somewhat akin to mountain chalets, while others can see it as being in the Wild West style. The station itself is now the place for shows and other events, only buses approach it now. Indeed, it is still a bus station.
The old station of the aerial tramway was built by the teams of Gustave Eiffel.
The thermal baths of César, renovated in 1999, were built in 1844.
The entirety of Rue Richelieu, followed by Rue de la Raillère, presents itself as the historic axis of the village.
Chalet Galitzine, dating from 1840.
Boulevard Latapie-Flurin has several notable buildings from the end of the 19th century, the Hotel d'Angleterre [England Hotel], the Continental Hotel and Casino Club. The Continental Hotel, became the Continental Residence building and the Casino Club, which became the Residence du Lys, offer ornate facades of many sculptures. The Continental Residence building has been registered as a historical monument since 1984, for its main façade.

Natural heritage

Notable people
Victor Hugo wrote a poem about Cauterets included in the third book Les Luttes et les Rêves [The struggles and dreams] of Les Contemplations: L’enfant voyant l'aïeule... [The child saw the grandmother...] (25 August 1843).
Giuseppe Verdi and Giuseppina Strepponi stayed in Cauterets during the summer of 1866, where the maestro pursued the composition of Don Carlos and tried to heal his chronic sore throat.
Louis Varney (1844–1908), composer of operettas died here.
Ralph Soupault (1904–1962), cartoonist in the collaborationist journal Je suis partout died in Cauterets on 12 August 1962.
Sim (1926–2009), his real name Simon Jacques Eugène Berryer, was an actor, comedian and writer, born in Cauterets.
On 17 November 2008, the military leader of ETA, Miguel Garikoitz Aspiazu Rubina, alias "Txeroki" [Cherokee], was arrested in Cauterets, bringing a severe blow to the Basque separatist organisation.
Gaston Phébus, Marguerite de Navarre, Queen Hortense, the Duchess of Berry, George Sand, Alfred de Vigny, Chateaubriand and French baritone Ismaël have also stayed there.

Cauterets in literature
Cauterets provides the framework of the Heptaméron, an unfinished collection of short stories written by Marguerite de Navarre. Flood waters involuntarily retained ten ladies and gentlemen at Cauterets, who were having spa treatment. They decide to entertain by telling a story each day.

Bibliography

Notes

References

External links

 Tourism office website (in French)
 Pyrenees travel guide
 French Tourist office website
 Cauterets town hall (in French)
 The thermes de Cauterets (in French)
 French ski school of Cauterets (in French)
 Cauterets on the National Geography Institute website (in French)

Spa towns in France
Communes of Hautes-Pyrénées
Pyrenees